Richard Lumley-Saunderson, 4th Earl of Scarbrough PC (May 1725 – 12 May 1782) was a British peer, styled Viscount Lumley from 1740 to 1752.

He was appointed a deputy lieutenant of the West Riding of Yorkshire on 4 August 1757. On 27 October 1759, he was appointed colonel of the North Lincolnshire battalion of militia, and was made a deputy lieutenant of Lincolnshire on 30 November 1761.

Scarbrough was Cofferer of the Household and deputy Earl Marshal from 1765 to 1766, and was sworn of the Privy Council in 1765.

Marriage and succession
He married Barbara, the daughter of Sir George Savile, 7th Baronet.  The couple had at least four children:

 George Lumley-Saunderson, 5th Earl of Scarbrough (22 September 1753 – 5 September 1807).
 Lady Frances Barbara Lumley-Saunderson (b. 25 February 1756).
 Richard Lumley-Saunderson, 6th Earl of Scarbrough (16 April 1757 – 17 June 1832).
 John Lumley-Savile, 7th Earl of Scarbrough (15 Jun 1760 – 21 February 1835).

He was succeeded in turn by his sons George, Richard and John.

References

1725 births
1782 deaths
Deputy Lieutenants of Lincolnshire
Deputy Lieutenants of the West Riding of Yorkshire
Members of the Privy Council of Great Britain
Earls of Scarbrough